Vivien Anne Law, Lady Shackleton,  (22 March 1954 – 19 February 2002) was a British linguist and academic, who specialised in grammar. Over her lifetime, she "acquired a grammatical knowledge of over a hundred languages". She spent all her academic career at the University of Cambridge.

Early life and education
Law was born on 22 March 1954 in Halifax, Nova Scotia, Canada. Her parents, John Ernest Law and Anne Elizabeth Law, were both English, and they had moved to Canada for his job with a telecommunications company. She was educated at Lemoyne d'Iberville High School, a state school in Longueuil, Quebec, and at Trafalgar School for Girls, a private all-girls school in Montreal, Quebec.

From 1971 to 1974, Law studied at McGill University. She graduated with a double honours Bachelor of Arts (BA) degree in classics and German. In 1974, she won a Commonwealth Scholarship to study at the University of Cambridge in England. She then matriculated into Girton College, Cambridge to undertake postgraduate research under the supervision of Michael Lapidge. She completed her Doctor of Philosophy (PhD) degree in 1979. Her doctoral thesis was titled "The Ars Bonifacii: a critical edition with introduction, and commentary on the sources".

Academic career
Law spent all her academic career at the University of Cambridge. She was a lecturer in the history of linguistics from 1984 to 1998, and Reader in the History of Linguistic Thought from 1998 to her death in 2002. She was also a research fellow at Jesus College, Cambridge from 1978 to 1980, a senior research fellow at Sidney Sussex College, Cambridge from 1980 to 1984, teaching fellow at Sidney Sussex College from 1984 to 1997, and fellow of Trinity College, Cambridge from 1997 to 2002.

Personal life
In 1986, Law married Nicholas John Shackleton, a noted geologist and paleoclimatologist. They did not have any children. Upon his knighthood in 1998, she became Lady Shackleton.

In 1999, Law was diagnosed with cancer. Treatment resulted in temporary remission. She died at her home in Cambridge on 20 February 2002, aged 47.

Honours
In 1999, Law was elected a Fellow of the British Academy, the United Kingdom's national academy for the humanities and the social sciences. The Vivien Law Prize was established in her memory in 2004 by the Henry Sweet Society and is awarded for "the best essay submitted on any topic within the history of linguistics".

Selected works

References

1954 births
2002 deaths
Linguists from the United Kingdom
Academics of the University of Cambridge
Fellows of the British Academy
Fellows of Jesus College, Cambridge
Fellows of Sidney Sussex College, Cambridge
Fellows of Trinity College, Cambridge
McGill University alumni
Alumni of Girton College, Cambridge
People from Halifax, Nova Scotia
20th-century linguists